Jérémy Livolant (born 9 January 1998) is a French professional footballer who plays as a right winger for Ligue 2 club Guingamp.

Club career
Livolant is a youth exponent from Guingamp. He made his Ligue 1 debut on 6 December 2015 against Girondins de Bordeaux.

He scores his first professional goal with EA Guingamp on 19/10/2020 against AJ Auxerre.

References

External links
 
 
 

1998 births
Living people
Sportspeople from Finistère
Association football forwards
French footballers
France youth international footballers
Ligue 1 players
Ligue 2 players
Championnat National players
Championnat National 3 players
En Avant Guingamp players
US Boulogne players
LB Châteauroux players
FC Sochaux-Montbéliard players
Footballers from Brittany